Masten Creek is a stream in Dodge County, in the U.S. state of Minnesota.

Masten Creek (formerly Maston's branch) was named for an early settler.

See also
List of rivers of Minnesota

References

Rivers of Dodge County, Minnesota
Rivers of Minnesota